The Baby Blake was a British cyclecar manufactured by E.G. Blake in Croydon, Surrey in 1922.

It was unusual in being powered by two separate stroke engines driving friction discs. A third disc running between these and moveable backwards and forwards gave an infinitely variable drive to the rear axle. They were advertised at £150 but few were sold.

See also
 List of car manufacturers of the United Kingdom

References

Vintage vehicles
Cyclecars
Defunct motor vehicle manufacturers of England
Vehicle manufacturing companies established in 1922
Defunct companies based in Surrey